The Institute of Plant and Animal Ecology is a biological research Institute in Yekaterinburg. The institute is part of the Russian Academy of Sciences.

References 

1944 establishments in Russia
Russian Academy of Sciences
Institutes of the Russian Academy of Sciences
Biological research institutes
Universities and institutes established in the Soviet Union
Research institutes in the Soviet Union
Research institutes established in 1944